Amyema gaudichaudii, commonly known as melaleuca mistletoe, is a plant in the family Loranthaceae endemic to eastern Australia. Like other mistletoes, it is a shrubby, woody, aerial hemiparasite plant. It has relatively small, wedge-shaped leaves and small, dark red flowers arranged in groups of three. It only grows on a few species of Melaleuca.

Description
The plant is glabrous apart from a few short rust-coloured hairs on the young branches and flower buds.

Taxonomy and naming
This mistletoe was first formally described in 1830 by Augustin Pyramus de Candolle, who gave it the name Loranthus gaudichaudii and published the description in Prodromus Systematis Naturalis Regni Vegetabilis. In 1895, the French botanist, Philippe Édouard Léon Van Tieghem changed the name to Amyema gaudichaudii. The specific epithet (gaudichaudii) honours Charles Gaudichaud-Beaupré, the collector of the type specimen.

Distribution and habitat
Amyema gaudichaudii only grows on melaleucas in forest and swamp woodland. It has been recorded on seven species of melaleuca, especially on M. decora and M. bracteata. It occurs in two disjunct populations in Queensland and New South Wales. In Queensland it is found in the western Darling Downs and in New South Wales in coastal areas between the Hunter and Illawarra districts.

Ecology
This mistletoe is a food source for the caterpillars of Delias aganippe and Ogyris amaryllis.

References

gaudichaudii
Parasitic plants
Flora of Queensland
Flora of New South Wales
Plants described in 1830